Encyclopedia is a television series created by the HBO Network and the for-profit branch of the Children's Television Workshop (CTW) (now known as Sesame Workshop), Distinguished Productions, Inc. (DPI), (now which has been folded into Sesame Workshop). The series premiered on the HBO network in 1988.

Each episode covered a letter or series of letters in the alphabet, with short skits of sketch comedy devoted to up to twelve corresponding encyclopedia topics. Several topics were related through song. Three of the six writers of the show had also been writers for NBC's Saturday Night Live: Patricia Marx, Brian McConnachie, and Mitchell Kriegman.

The series featured the band BETTY, who performed both the opening and closing themes as well as individual songs for selected topics.

Topics
The series covered the following topics:

Awards
Daytime Emmy Awards:

Outstanding Achievement in Costume Design: Calista Hendrickson
Outstanding Achievement in Makeup: Paul Gebbia

Merchandising

Video
All episodes were released on VHS in the late 1990s. They are no longer available commercially, but often appear on eBay.

External links
The New York Times: CTW Romps Onto Cable With 'Encyclopedia' by Alison Leigh Cowan 

 

HBO original programming
American children's education television series
1988 American television series debuts
1989 American television series endings
1980s American children's television series
English-language television shows
HBO Shows (series) WITHOUT Episode info, list, or Article
Television series by Sesame Workshop